Robert Milton Speer (September 8, 1838 – January 17, 1890) was a Democratic member of the U.S. House of Representatives from Pennsylvania.

Robert M. Speer was born in Cassville, Pennsylvania.  He attended Cassville Academy, taught school, studied law, was admitted to the bar in 1859 and commenced practice in Huntingdon, Pennsylvania.  He was elected assistant clerk of the Pennsylvania State House of Representatives in 1863.

Speer was elected as a Democrat to the Forty-second and Forty-third Congresses.  He was not a candidate for renomination in 1874.  He was a delegate to the Democratic National Conventions in 1872 and 1880.  He resumed the practice of law and in 1876 became one of the proprietors of the Huntingdon Monitor.  He was an unsuccessful candidate for election in 1880 to the Forty-seventh Congress.  He died in New York City in 1890.  Interment is in Riverview Cemetery in Huntingdon, Pennsylvania.

Sources

Robert Milton Speer at The Political Graveyard

External links
Robert Milton Speer papers, 1861-1872, Ms. Coll. 1032 Kislak Center for Special Collections, Rare Books and Manuscripts, University of Pennsylvania

1838 births
1890 deaths
Pennsylvania lawyers
Democratic Party members of the United States House of Representatives from Pennsylvania
19th-century American politicians
19th-century American lawyers